Siberian onion is a common name for several flowering plants and may refer to:

Allium fistulosum
Allium ochotense
Allium sibiricum